Lipovac is a Serbo-Croatian toponym and surname. It may refer to:

Places 
 Lipovac (Čelinac), a village in Republika Srpska, Bosnia and Herzegovina
 Lipovac (Srebrenica), a village in Republika Srpska, Bosnia and Herzegovina
 Lipovac, Vukovar-Syrmia County, a village near Nijemci, Croatia
 Lipovac, Virovitica-Podravina County, a village near Gradina, Croatia
 Lipovac, Karlovac County, a village near Rakovica, Croatia
 Lipovac (Aleksinac), a village in Serbia
 Lipovac (Gornji Milanovac), a village in Serbia
 Lipovac (Kruševac), a village in Serbia
 Lipovac (Ražanj), a village in Serbia
 Lipovac (Topola), a village in Serbia
 Lipovac (Vranje), a village in Serbia
 Srednji Lipovac, a village near Nova Kapela, Croatia

See also 
 Lipovec (disambiguation)
 Lypovets
 Lipovača (disambiguation)
 Lipovo (disambiguation)
 Lipovci, a village in Slovenia
 Gornji Lipovac (disambiguation), villages in Serbia and Croatia
 Donji Lipovac (disambiguation), villages in Serbia and Croatia